Balladeering is a 2009 studio album by Danish jazz guitarist Jakob Bro.

Balladeering is the first part of a trilogy which includes Time (2011) and December Song (2013). The trilogy was nominated for the Nordic Council Music Prize 2014. The vinyl version of the album came with a DVD featuring the movie Weightless which documented the making of the album.

Track listing 

All tracks composed by Jakob Bro

"Weightless" (5:32)
"Evening Song" (4:40)
"Vraa" (7:15)
"Starting Point / Acoustic Version" (4:40)
"Greenland" (7:18)
"Terrace Place" (5:01)
"Sort" (4.00)
"Starting Point / Electric Version" (6:08)

Personnel 
Jakob Bro – guitar
Lee Konitz – alto saxophone
Bill Frisell – guitar
Ben Street – bass guitar
Paul Motian – drums

References

Balladeering
Jakob Bro albums